Boris Bershteyn (born 1977) is an Obama administration official who until June 2013 had served as acting Administrator of the Office of Information and Regulatory Affairs.  He previously served from 2011 to 2012 as general counsel for the federal Office of Management and Budget.  Prior to his work at the Office of Management and Budget, he served as an Associate White House Counsel.

Early life and education

Born in Kiev and raised in the former Soviet Union,  Bershteyn attended Lynbrook High School and earned a bachelor's degree from Stanford University in 1999. He then earned a law degree from Yale Law School in 2004.

Bershteyn served as a law clerk for United States Court of Appeals for the Second Circuit Judge José A. Cabranes from 2004 until 2005.  Bershteyn then served as a law clerk to Associate Justice David Souter of the U.S. Supreme Court from 2006 until 2007.

Professional career
Early in his career, Bershteyn worked as a lawyer for the law firms Skadden, Arps, Slate, Meagher & Flom and Wachtell, Lipton, Rosen & Katz. From April 2009 until November 2010, Bershteyn served as the deputy general counsel for the Office of Management and Budget. From November 2010 until June 2011, he served as an Associate White House Counsel. On June 21, 2011, he was named general counsel of OMB. He left that position in 2012 to become acting Administrator of the Office of Information and Regulatory Affairs. He held that post until June 2013, when the U.S. Senate confirmed Howard Shelanski to serve as OIRA's Administrator. Bershteyn is currently a partner with Skadden.

Personal
Bershteyn married Sofia Yakren, also an attorney, in 2007.

Bershteyn is Jewish.

See also 
 List of law clerks of the Supreme Court of the United States (Seat 3)

References

1977 births
Living people
21st-century American lawyers
American people of Ukrainian-Jewish descent
Law clerks of the Supreme Court of the United States
Lynbrook High School alumni
Obama administration personnel
Skadden, Arps, Slate, Meagher & Flom people
Stanford University alumni
Yale Law School alumni
Date of birth missing (living people)